Second extinction may refer to:

 Second Extinction, a video game
 Late Devonian extinction, second of the five most severe extinction events in the history of the Earth's biota